Indian gaming may refer to:

Native American gaming, gambling activities on indigenous tribal lands in the United States
Gambling in India, gambling activities in the country of India
Video games in India, other types of electronic games in the country of India